Chertok may refer to:
 
6358 Chertok, an asteroid
Chertok, Belarus, a village
Boris Chertok (1912–2011), Russian rocket designer
Jack Chertok (1906–1995), American film and television producer
Pearl Chertok (1918–1981), American harpist
Benson T. Chertok (1935–1981), American physicist

Russian-language surnames